Cosamaloapan is a city located in the plains of the Sotavento zone in the central zone of the State of Veracruz, about 240 km from state capital Xalapa. It has a surface of 323.26 km2.

The poet Manuel Carpio was born in Cosamaloapan. Cosamaloapan serves as the municipal seat of the municipality of Cosamaloapan de Carpio, which was so renamed in honour of its most famous son in 1918.

Geographic Limits

The municipality of Cosamaloapan is delimited to the north by Tierra Blanca and Ixmatlahuacan to the south by Chacaltianguis and Tuxtilla to the east by Carlos A. Carrillo and to the west by Tres Valles.  It is watered by small creeks of the river Papaloapan.

Agriculture

It produces principally maize, beans, sugarcane, watermelon and green chile.

Celebrations

In  Cosamaloapan, in May takes place the celebration in honor of the Virgen de la Concepción, Patron of the town, and in December takes place the celebration in honor of the Virgen de Guadalupe.

Weather

The weather in Cosamaloapan is warm  and wet all year with rains in summer and autumn.

References

External links 

  Municipal Official webpage
  Municipal Official Information

Municipalities of Veracruz